Muzzy may refer to:

People
 Muzzy Izzet (born 1974), Turkish-English former footballer
 Muzzy Marcellino (1912–1997), American singer and musician
 Rob Muzzy, American motorcycle racing team manager
 Muzz, a British DJ and musical artist (formerly Muzzy)
 Washington Muzzy (1828-1898), American farmer and politician

In fiction
 Muzzy is a large furry alien who appears in the BBC educational films Muzzy in Gondoland, Muzzy Vocabulary Builder and Muzzy Comes Back''

Places

United States
 Mount Jefferson (Massachusetts), also known as Muzzy Hill
 Muzzy Field, stadium in Bristol, Connecticut